East Dover Hundred in the U.S. state of Delaware was originally part of St. Jones Hundred, which was renamed Dover Hundred in 1823, which was then divided in 1877 into two hundreds: East Dover Hundred and West Dover Hundred.

External links
EAST DOVER HUNDRED KC 21 (State of Delaware Information)

Hundreds in New Castle County, Delaware